Michael Kane is an American writer and journalist. He is currently the entertainment features writer for the New York Post. In 2009 he wrote a book published by Viking Press called GAME BOYS: PROFESSIONAL VIDEOGAMING'S RISE FROM THE BASEMENT TO THE BIG TIME, which details the American professional Counter-Strike community.

Kane was a sports writer and editor at the Denver Post. His work has appeared in ESPN Magazine, and Sport Magazine.

References

New York Post people
American sports journalists
Writers from Denver
Living people
Year of birth missing (living people)